Parke H. Wentling (born ) is an American politician and current member of the Pennsylvania House of Representatives, representing the 7th District since 2023. A Republican, Wentling previously represented the 17th District from 2015 until 2022.

Early life, education, and career
Wentling was born on May 14, 1972 in Greenville, Pennsylvania. He was raised in Greenville and graduated from Greenville Area High School in 1990. Wentling earned a Bachelor of Science degree from California University of Pennsylvania in 1997 and a Master in Science from Clarion University of Pennsylvania in 2010. From 1997 to 2014, Wentling taught at Wilmington Area School District.

Political career
In 2014, Wentling was first elected to represent the 17th District in the Pennsylvania House of Representatives. He was twice re-elected to represent the 17th District in 2018 and 2020. Following redistricting, Wentling was moved to the 7th District, which he was elected to represent in 2022.

Personal life
Wentling lives in Greenville, Pennsylvania with his wife Jennifer and their two children. They attend Zion’s Reformed Church in Greenville, where Wentling also serves as a deacon.

References

Living people
Republican Party members of the Pennsylvania House of Representatives
21st-century American politicians
1972 births

California University of Pennsylvania alumni